Erling Sachs Wicklund (7 June 1944 – 8 August 2019) was a Norwegian jazz trombonist, composer, arranger and journalist, known for a series of jazz programs on NRK.

Career 
Wicklund was born in Göteborg, Sweden, and studied musicology, art history and English at the University of Oslo, composition and arranging at "Dick Grove School of Music" in Los Angeles, and trombone at Musikkonservatoriet in Oslo. From the 1960s he played in "Veitvet Musikkskoles storband", "Universitetet i Oslos Storband", Filharmonisk Selskaps Orkester, orchestras at Chat Noir, Det Norske Teatret, Oslo Nye Teater, Nationaltheatret, "Thorleif Østerengs storband", "Radiostorbandet" as well as at Club 7, bands led by Arild Wikstrøm and Earl Wilson's "Band No Name". From 1968 he has been music producer and journalist at NRK. Radio host at NRK P2 and NRK Jazz. He is also the leader of his own bands "Storeslem", "Streetswingers", "Sixpack", "Take Five", "Trombone for Two". His newest band is the octet "Octopus".

While he led quintet "Oolyakoo" with Atle Hammer (trompet) from 1976. "Storeslem" was initiated in 1991, together with 16 professional musicians they released Wicklunds compositions in 2008.  His trio "Streetswingers" with Jan Berger (guitar) and Erik Amundsen (bass) released the album About time (2001), and has subsequently varied the lineup with guitarists Bjørn Vidar Solli, Staffan William-Olsson, Frode Kjekstad, Halvard Kausland, and the bassist Stig Hvalryg. The sextet "Sixpack" with Atle Hammer, Harald Bergersen, Staffan William-Olsson, Stig Hvalryg and Lars Erik Norum held a concert at "Oslo Jazzfestival" 2007, presenting the world premiere of twelve compositions by Wicklund. The quintet "Take Five" has among others cooperated with saxophonist Håvard Fossum and pianist Ove Alexander Billington. In the quintet "Trombone for two" he participates with trombonist Harald A. Halvorsen and they performed several concerts in 2008. The octet "Octopus" plays originals by Wicklund as well as classics by Bill Holman, Marty Paich and Lars Gullin.

As a music producer and journalist at NRK, Wicklund is most famous for the programs "Norske jazzprofiler" and "Åpent hus", with several unique recordings from the Norwegian jazz scene Club 7 in the 1970s. He has produced numerous jazz concerts, festival reports and portraits, and in 1991 a TV series "Ung norsk jazz" at NRK with the producer Jan Horne. In the 90s he was the producer for "Midt i musikken", later jazz reviewer in "Kulturnytt" at NRK P2. From 2008 he served on the editorial board for 24-hour DAB and online channel NRK Jazz.

Several Wicklund radio productions are released on CD, like Radka Toneff Fairytales (1982), The Norwegian Radio Big Band meets Bob Florence (1986), The Norwegian Radio Big Band meets Bill Holman (1989), Jens Wendelboe's Crazy Energy Jazz Quartet Get crazy (1998), Kjell Karlsen Big Band Big Band Bonanza (2001), Hallgeir Pedersen Trio West Coast Blues (2002), Nora Brockstedt As Time Goes By (2004), The NRK Sessions – Soul, Afro-Jazz and Latin from the Club 7 Scene (2007), Christian Reim Unreleased works 1969–1979 (2008), Carl Magnus Neumann Live at Kongsberg and other unreleased works (2008), Helge Hurum Spectre The unreleased works 1971–1982, Svein Finnerud Trio Preachers The unreleased works 1969–1980 (2007), and Svein Finnerud Trio The Complete Released Works 1968–1999 (2008). He was also the producer for the last recording The end of a tune by guitarist Thorgeir Stubø.
  
As a child actor Wicklund contributed to over 100 NRK radio play for "Radioteatret", "Skolekringkastinga" and "Barnetimen", in the 1950s. He also had child roles at "Det Norske Teatret" and was the character "Henriks sønn" in Arne Skouen's Oscar nominated film Ni liv (1957).

Honors 
1974: Molderosen at Moldejazz
2014: Awarded the Norwegian King's Medal of Merit, Kongens Fortjenstmedalje

Discography 
2001: About time (Hot Club Records), with Streetswingers
2008: Erling Wicklund's Storeslem – Live at Lancelot (Ponca Jazz Records), with his own compositions and main soloists Atle Hammer and Harald Bergersen.

Filmography 
1957: Nine Lives - Henriks sønn

References

External links 
MIC Bransjeregister
Glimt fra gamle dager: Se unike fotos fra NRK-jazzens gullalder on NRK Jazz 

Norwegian music journalists
University of Oslo alumni
20th-century Norwegian trombonists
21st-century Norwegian trombonists
Norwegian jazz trombonists
Male trombonists
Norwegian jazz composers
Ponca Jazz Records artists
Musicians from Gothenburg
2019 deaths
1944 births
21st-century trombonists
Male jazz composers
20th-century Swedish male musicians
20th-century Swedish musicians
21st-century Swedish male musicians